The Pope of the Coptic Orthodox Church, also known as the Bishop of Alexandria, is the leader of the Coptic Orthodox Church, with ancient Christian roots in Egypt.  The current holder of this position is Pope Tawadros II, who was selected as the  118th pope on November 18, 2012.

Following the traditions of the church, the pope is chairman and head of the Holy Synod of the Coptic Orthodox Patriarchate of Alexandria. The Holy Synod is the highest authority in the Church of Alexandria, which has between 12 and 18 million members worldwide, 10 to 14 million of whom are in Egypt. The pope is also the chairman of the church's General Congregation Council.

Although historically associated with the city of Alexandria, the residence and Seat of the Coptic Orthodox Pope of Alexandria has been located in Cairo since 1047. The pope is currently established in Saint Mark's Coptic Orthodox Cathedral, inside a compound which includes the Patriarchal Palace, with an additional residence at the Monastery of Saint Pishoy.

The liturgy of the Altar Ballot took place on November 4, 2012.  The 60-year-old Bishop Tawadoros, Auxiliary Bishop of Beheira, assistant to Metropolitan Pachomios of Beheira, was chosen as the 118th Pope of Alexandria.  He then chose the name of Theodoros II. He was formally enthroned on November 18, 2012.

History 

The early Christian Church recognized the special significance of several cities as leaders of the worldwide Church. The Church of Alexandria is one of these original patriarchates, but the succession to the role of patriarch in Alexandria is still disputed after the separation which followed the Council of Chalcedon.

The later development of the Pentarchy also granted secular recognition to these religious leaders.  Because of this split, the leadership of this church is not part of this system.

Members of the Coptic Orthodox Church consider their heads as direct successors of Mark the Evangelist, as they consider Mark the first Bishop of Alexandria and founder the Church in the 1st century.

Election 

The pope of the Coptic Orthodox Church is elected with the following procedure since 1957:

Then, during the ceremony, a blindfolded child pulls one of three cards from within a chalice, each with the name of a different candidate written on them, out of a silver urn. The name on the card picked by the child will be the identity of the person chosen to be the new pope.

After the death of Shenouda III on March 17, 2012 the Holy Synod of the Coptic Orthodox Church voted on a successor. The names of the three candidates who received most votes were put in a glass chalice. One name was then picked by a blindfolded boy, believed to be guided by the hand of God. The man thus picked by divine choice became the new Patriarch of Alexandria. Shenouda III had been elected in a similar fashion.

Historical evolution of the ecclesiastical title

Pope 
The word pope derives from Greek πάππας meaning "father".

A record in history of the term "pope" is assigned to Pope Heraclas of Alexandria in a letter written by the bishop of Rome, Dionysius, to Philemon:
which translates into:

It is difficult to ascertain the identity of the first Bishop of Rome to carry the title Pope of Rome. Some sources suggest that it was Pope Marcellinus (died 304 AD).

From the 6th century, the imperial chancery of Constantinople normally reserved this designation for the Bishop of Rome. From the early 6th century, it began to be confined in the West to the Bishop of Rome, a practice that was firmly in place by the 11th century, when Pope Gregory VII declared it reserved for the Bishop of Rome.

See also 

Coptic Orthodox Church
List of Coptic Orthodox popes
The Holy Synod of the Coptic Orthodox Church
Seat of the Coptic Orthodox Pope of Alexandria
Patriarch of Alexandria

References

Further reading 
 
 
 
 
 
 
 
 Bailey, Betty Jane; Martin Bailey, J (June 18, 2009). Who are the Christians in the Middle East?. William B. Eerdmans Publishing. , p. 145ss.
 Kamil, Jill (1997). Coptic Egypt: History and Guide. Cairo: American University in Cairo.
 "Egypt Religions & Peoples from 'LOOKLEX Encyclopedia. LookLex Ltd.. September 30, 2008.
Further reading on traditions and procedures for electing the patriarch may be found at:
 Saad Michael Saad and Nardine Miranda Saad, “Electing Coptic Patriarchs: A Diversity of Traditions,” Bulletin of St. Shenouda the Archimandrite Coptic Society (Los Angeles), vol. 6, pp. 20–32, 2000: .
 Mounir Shoucri, “Patriarchal Election,” The Coptic Encyclopedia, Aziz Atiya, ed., (New York: Macmillan, 1991) pp. 1911–2. Now available at the Claremont Coptic Encyclopedia: Patriarchal Election .
 Otto F.A. Meinardus, “Procedures of Election of Coptic Patriarchs,” in Christian Egypt: Faith and Life. Cairo: American University in Cairo Press, 1970), pp. 90–141.
 M. Guirguis and N. van Doorn-Harder, The Emergence of the Modern Coptic Papacy: The Egyptian Church and Its Leadership from the Ottoman Period to the Present, Cairo: American University in Cairo Press, 2011, pp. 111–127.
 Saad Michael Saad, (in Arabic) “التقاليد القبطية في انتخاب بابا الإسكندرية,” Watani, 4 November 2001.

External links 

 Former official website

 
Lists of Oriental Orthodox Christians
Egypt religion-related lists
Alexandria-related lists